Ibrahim Bosso Mounkoro (born 23 February 1990) is a Malian professional footballer who plays as a goalkeeper for Linafoot club TP Mazembe and the Mali national team.

International career 
Mounkoro made his debut for Mali in a 3–2 friendly loss to Algeria on 16 June 2019. His first competitive match was a 2–1 win over Namibia in the 2021 African Cup of Nations qualifiers on 17 November 2020. 

In a match against Tunisia at the 2021 Africa Cup of Nations, Mounkoro saved a penalty from Wahbi Khazri, helping Mali win the match 1–0.

Honours 
Stade Malien
 Malian Première Division: 2012–13, 2013–14
 Malian Cup: 2013

TP Mazembe
 CAF Champions League: 2015
CAF Confederation Cup: 2016, 2017
CAF Super Cup: 2016
Linafoot: 2015–16, 2016–17, 2018–19, 2019–20
 DR Congo Super Cup: 2016

References

External links 
 
 
 TP Mazembe Profile

1990 births
Living people
Malian footballers
Association football goalkeepers
Mali international footballers
AS Korofina players
Stade Malien players
TP Mazembe players
Malian Première Division players
Linafoot players
2019 Africa Cup of Nations players
2021 Africa Cup of Nations players
Malian expatriate footballers
Expatriate footballers in the Democratic Republic of the Congo
Malian expatriate sportspeople in the Democratic Republic of the Congo
21st-century Malian people